Installation may refer to:

 Installation (computer programs)
 Installation, work of installation art
 Installation, military base
 Installation, into an office, especially a religious (Installation (Christianity)) or political one